80's Cheesecake is a solo album produced and written by Tom Ellard of Severed Heads. It was released in 1982 as a C60 cassette tape through his own Terse Tapes label. According to Ellard, the album, along with his previous one, Snappy Carrion (1982), were recorded out of interest in making pop music. It is a precursor of Severed Heads' shift in sound, from their early industrialised sound to the more accessible electronic styles of their later recordings. Tracks from this cassette appeared on the Severed Heads' compilation album Clifford Darling, Please Don't Live in the Past (1985).

Reception

Track listing

4, 5 and 13 are new songs made of salvaged and backed-up parts from recordings from this period.

Release history

References

External links
 
 Bandcamp page

1982 albums